Immolation is an American death metal band from Yonkers, New York. They are considered one of the leaders of the New York death metal scene along with Incantation, Mortician and Suffocation.

History
Immolation was founded after the demise of Rigor Mortis (NY), a band formed in May 1986 by Andrew Sakowicz (bass guitar, vocals) Dave Wilkinson (drums), and Robert Vigna (guitar). After recording the Decomposed and Warriors of Doom demos, Sakowicz left the band in early 1988 and was replaced by Ross Dolan, and the band's name was changed to "Immolation". The new lineup put out two studio demos, in 1988 and 1989, and gained a worldwide following in the underground death metal scene. Immolation signed a record deal with Roadrunner Records and released their debut album Dawn of Possession in 1991. After leaving Roadrunner, the band released "Stepping on Angels," a compilation of demo releases and live tracks. In 1995 the band was signed by Metal Blade Records and released three albums: Here in After, Failures for Gods, and Close to a World Below. After their second album, drummer Craig Smilowski left the band and was replaced by Alex Hernandez. Their next three albums, Unholy Cult, Harnessing Ruin, and Shadows in the Light were released by French label Listenable Records and Century Media in the US.

In May 2001, Immolation were the headliners for a tour in Europe with supporting bands: Deranged, Deströyer 666, Decapitated and Soul Demise. Unholy Cult saw the departure of guitarist Thomas Wilkinson and the addition of ex-Angelcorpse guitarist Bill Taylor. Steve Shalaty replaced Hernandez on Harnessing Ruin. In February 2008, Immolation toured the US alongside bands such as Rotting Christ, Belphegor and Averse Sefira. In January and February 2010, Immolation toured with headliner Nile along with Krisiun, Rose Funeral, and Dreaming Dead.

In March 2010, Immolation released Majesty and Decay through Nuclear Blast. In 2011, they released the 5-track Providence EP through Scion A/V as a free download. In May 2013, Immolation released Kingdom of Conspiracy, again via Nuclear Blast, and toured with Cannibal Corpse and Napalm Death on a tour sponsored by Decibel Magazine. At the end of 2016, Bill Taylor left the band for personal reasons, and was replaced by Alex Bouks. In 2017 Immolation released their tenth full-length album Atonement. In 2022, Immolation released their eleventh full-length album Acts of God.

Musical style and lyrical themes
Immolation relies on riffs written in dissonant harmonic patterns, often dueling between the two guitars, to progress songs, typically over complex rhythm and drum patterns. Their riffs are often a mixture of fast tremolo picking and a lot of power chords and pinched harmonics to lay down a wall of sound that many bands have tried to use in their own music. Their guitar parts are often highly complex and technically proficient; drum parts are often written to follow the guitar riffs in a way that is unusual for most death metal. They and Incantation helped bring the New York death metal scene to the attention of the underground. Their debut album is frequently cited as being an important and highly influential album, having laid down the blueprint that bands such as Cryptopsy and Suffocation would follow with their respective debuts.

Guitarist Robert Vigna and vocalist/bassist Ross Dolan have been the only constant members throughout the band's history. Vigna is considered to be one of the most talented death metal guitarists and is well known for his complex riffing and wailing solos.

The band's lyrics from Dawn of Possession to Unholy Cult are largely anti-religion, especially anti-Christianity. Beginning with Harnessing Ruin, there are more lyrics touching on other subjects such as politics. As Ross Dolan explained, the band's shift in lyrical theme was motivated by current events:

Discography

Studio albums
Dawn of Possession (1991)
Here in After (1996)
Failures for Gods (1999)
Close to a World Below (2000)
Unholy Cult (2002)
Harnessing Ruin (2005)
Shadows in the Light (2007)
Majesty and Decay (2010)
Kingdom of Conspiracy (2013)
Atonement (2017)
Acts of God (2022)

EPs
Hope and Horror (EP + DVD, 2007)
Providence (EP, 2011)

DVD
Bringing Down the World (DVD, 2004)

Compilation
Stepping on Angels... Before Dawn (1995)

Lineup
 Robert Vigna – lead guitar (1986–present)
 Ross Dolan – bass, vocals (1988–present)
 Steve Shalaty – drums (2003–present)
 Alex Bouks – rhythm guitar (2016–present)

Former
Andrew Sakowicz – bass, vocals (1986–1988)
Dave Wilkinson – drums (1986–1988; died 2018)
Thomas Wilkinson – rhythm guitar (1988–2001)
Neal Boback – drums (1988–1989)
Craig Smilowski – drums (1989–1996)
Alex Hernandez – drums (1996–2003)
 Bill Taylor – rhythm guitar (2001–2016)

Live musicians
John McEntee – rhythm guitar (2001)

Timeline

References

External links

Official Facebook
Immolation at Encyclopaedia Metallum

1986 establishments in New York (state)
Death metal musical groups from New York (state)
Musical groups established in 1986
Musical quartets
Nuclear Blast artists
Roadrunner Records artists
Metal Blade Records artists
Listenable Records artists